Robert Clarges (c. 1693 - before 1727) was an English Tory MP.

Clarges was the third son of Sir Walter Clarges, 1st Baronet, the first son of his marriage to Elizabeth, daughter of Sir Thomas Gould, Sheriff of London, widow of Sir Robert Wymondsell. He was educated at St Paul's School, London and Trinity College, Cambridge. His father died in 1706 whilst Clarges was still a minor and his inheritance of Stoke Poges Rectory Manor was held in trust for him until he became of age.

He was elected MP for Reading from 1713 to 30 May 1716. Clarges was described as a Tory who might often vote Whig. He voted against the Septennial Act 1716. His election was declared void on 30 May 1716.

He died unmarried apparently before April 1727 (he was not mentioned in his mother's will of that date). His estate was administered by his mother and elder brother. The Rectory Manor passed to his brother George.

Notes

1690s births
1720s deaths
Alumni of Trinity College, Cambridge
Members of the Parliament of Great Britain for Reading
British MPs 1713–1715
British MPs 1715–1722
Tory MPs (pre-1834)
Younger sons of baronets